"S.S.T." is a song by American musician Prince which was recorded and released directly after the impact of 2005's Hurricane Katrina. It was officially released as a digital download by the NPG Music Club on September 3, 2005, and reached number one on the iTunes R&B chart. It was later made available as a CD single through commercial outlets. All proceeds from the recording went to hurricane relief.

The song's title alludes to Sade's 1985 song "The Sweetest Taboo", which is namechecked more than once in the lyrics. "S.S.T." also refers to sea surface temperature, which is used to monitor the threat of hurricanes.

The B-side of the single is the instrumental "Brand New Orleans".

Charts

References

2005 singles
Hurricane Katrina disaster relief charity singles
Prince (musician) songs
Songs written by Prince (musician)
NPG Records singles
2005 songs
Song recordings produced by Prince (musician)